Professor Roy T. Eriksen (8 October 1948 – 22 April 2019) was a Norwegian Renaissance scholar and Marlowe scholar teaching at University of Agder.

Education and Employment 
Roy T. Eriksen studied at the University of Oslo with Maren-Sofie Røstvig. He wrote his Ph.D thesis on a structural analysis of Christopher Marlowe’s Doctor Faustus.

Taught at University of Oslo 1977-1986:
 Research Fellow in English Literature, 1977
 Senior Lecturer in Comparative Literature, 1986

Taught at University of Tromsø 1986-2003
 Professor of English Literature 1986-2003

Professor of Renaissance Studies, at the Norwegian Institute in Rome, 1997-2000 
Taught at University of Bergen 1997-1999
 Appointed Professor of English Literature

Taught at University of Agder 2003-2019
 Professor English Renaissance Literature and Culture

Visiting Fellowships
 British Council Fellow, Cambridge University, 1982–1983
 NAVF Research Fellow, Cambridge University, 1986
 Visiting Professor, Villa I Tatti, Florence, 1990–1991, 1994, 1996, 2008
 Universit`s di Padova, Guest Professor 2017

Eriksen was head of the international research group Early Modern Research Group based at the University of Agder. He was general editor of the interdisciplinary journal Early Modern Culture Online and general editor of the bookseries Early Modern and Modern Studies.

Academic Awards
 Eriksen received Agder Academy of Sciences and Letters's award for outstanding research in 2007.

Festschrift 
Festschrifts in honor of Eriksen were produced in 1998 and 2008.
 Guest, Clare Lapraik (2008) Rhetoric, theatre and the arts of design : essays presented to Roy Eriksen Oslo: Novus Press

Publications

Books 
 The Forme of Faustus Fortunes. A Study of the Tragedie of Doctor Faustus (1616), 1987, 82-560-0416-9
 The Building in the text. Alberti to Shakespeare and Milton, 2001 
 L'Edifio testuale. Milano; Mimesis, 2014. Revised and expanded translation of The Building in the Text (in collaboration with Penn UP.

Translations
 Christopher Marlowe, Doktor Faustus: En tragedie (Doctor Faustus: A Tragedy), Solum, 1987
 John Marston, Kurtisanen (The Dutch Courtesan), Solum, 1988
 William Shakespeare, 1 Henrik den fjerde (1 Henry the Fourth), Solum, 1989

Edited Volumes 
 Contexts of Pre – Novel Narrative: The European Tradition, 1994
 Contexts of Baroque: Theatre, Metamorphosis, and Design, 1997
 Rhetoric across the Humanities (with Toril Swan), 1999
 Innovation and Tradition: Essays in Renaissance Art and Culture  (with Dag T. Andersson), 2000, 
 The Burden of the Ceremony Master (with Staale Sinding-Larsen, 2001
 Ashes to ashes : art in Rome between humanism and maniera (with Victor Plahte Tschudi), 2006, 
 Imitation, representation and printing in the Italian Renaissance (with Magne Malmanger), 2009,

References 

Academic staff of the University of Agder
1948 births
Norwegian architecture writers
2019 deaths